= South Pacific Sea Level and Climate Monitoring Project =

South Pacific Sea Level and Climate Monitoring Project (SPSLCMP) is a project initiated by government of Australia. The primary goal of the project is to provide accurate, long term records of the variance of the sea level in the Pacific and South Pacific oceans.

== Participants ==
There are 14 Pacific islands participating in the sea level and climate monitoring project. These include:

- Cook Islands
- Federated States of Micronesia
- Fiji
- Kiribati
- Marshall Islands
- Nauru
- Niue
- Palau
- Papua New Guinea
- Samoa
- Solomon Islands
- Tonga
- Tuvalu
- Vanuatu
